General Htun Aung (born 1967), also spelt Tun Aung, is a Burmese military officer. He currently serves as commander-in-chief of the Myanmar Air Force.

Military career 
Htun Aung graduated from the 29th batch of the Defence Services Academy. In 2020, he sat on the board of directors of Myanma Economic Holdings Limited, a military-owned conglomerate.

On 12 January 2022, Htun Aung was appointed as the commander-in-chief of the Myanmar Air Force, succeeding Maung Maung Kyaw, who was forced to retire from the military. Prior to his promotion, he served as Maung Maung Kyaw's chief of staff.

In the aftermath of the 2021 Myanmar coup d'état, the Burmese military has launched airstrikes against anti-regime resistance forces and civilians. On 30 June 2022, under Htun Aung's command, a Burmese fighter jet violated Thai airspace after flying  into Phop Phra district in Thailand's Tak province. Htun Aung subsequently issued an apology to this Thai counterpart, Napadej Dhupatemiya. The governments of the European Union, Canada, the United States and the United Kingdom have sanctioned Htun Aung for human rights violations.

See also 

 2021–2023 Myanmar civil war
 State Administration Council
 Tatmadaw

References 

Living people
Burmese generals
Defence Services Academy alumni
1967 births